Hasanabad (also Romanized as Ḩasanābād) is a village in Fajr Rural District, in the Central District of Gonbad-e Qabus County, Golestan Province, Iran. As of the 2006 census, its population was 1,277, distributed among 279 families.

References 

Populated places in Gonbad-e Kavus County